Jim O'Hara (born January 14, 1954) is an American politician in the State of Montana. He served in the Montana House of Representatives from 2017 to 2019, representing District 27. He was elected as County Commissioner for Chouteau County, Montana in 2001 and ran to be the Republican candidate for Governor of Montana in 2012.

Early life and business career

Jim O'Hara was born and raised in Fort Benton, MT near the sight where his grandfather homesteaded in 1910. He worked as a small farmer for over 20 years until he and his wife, Vicky, became small business owners, buying the Daily Grind in Great Falls.

O'Hara is a founder and board member of Lubigreen Biosynthetics, a research and development firm focusing on environmentally friendly lubricants.

Chouteau County Commissioner

O'Hara was elected Chouteau County Commissioner in 2001

2012 gubernatorial campaign

O'Hara announced his candidacy in January, 2011. He spent seven years painting and placing his own billboards in each county in Montana, with each billboard depicting a different Montana county courthouse. He received national coverage on CBS for painting and placing his own billboards across the entire state.

State Representative

In 2016, O'Hara ran for the State House of Representatives to replace Representative Roy Hollandsworth who did not seek reelection. He defeated Darold Hutchinson in the Republican primary and won the general election.

Election results

2012

2016

References

1954 births
Businesspeople from Montana
County commissioners in Montana
Living people
2012 Montana elections
Republican Party members of the Montana House of Representatives